Wołczenica is a river in north-western Poland.

References

Rivers of Poland
Rivers of West Pomeranian Voivodeship